Pathé Records was an international record company and label and producer of phonographs, based in France, and active from the 1890s through the 1930s.

Early years 
The Pathé record business was founded by brothers Charles and Émile Pathé, then owners of a successful bistro in Paris. In the mid-1890s, they began selling Edison and Columbia phonographs and accompanying cylinder records. Shortly thereafter, the brothers designed and sold their own phonographs. These incorporated elements of other brands. Soon after, they also started marketing pre-recorded cylinder records. By 1896 the Pathé brothers had offices and recording studios not only in Paris, but also in London, Milan, and St. Petersburg.

Pathé cylinders and discs 

In 1894, the Pathé brothers started selling their own phonographs. The earliest Pathé offerings were phonograph cylinders. Pathé manufactured cylinder records until approximately 1914. In addition to standard size cylinder records, Pathé produced several larger styles. The "Salon" records measured 3½ inches (8.9 cm) in diameter and the larger "Stentor" records measured 5 inches (12.7 cm) in diameter. The "Le Céleste" records, the largest commercial cylinder records manufactured by any phonograph company, measured 5 inches (12.7 cm) in diameter by 9 inches (22.9 cm) long.

In 1905 the Pathé brothers entered the growing field of disc records. They needed to employ several unusual technologies as preventive measures against patent infringement. At first they sold single-sided discs with a recording in wax on top of a cement base. In October 1906 they started producing discs in the more usual manner with shellac. Even with this less eccentric material, the early Pathé discs were unlike any others. The sound was recorded vertically in the groove, rather than side-to-side, and the groove was wider than in other companies' records, requiring a special ball-shaped  stylus for playing. The discs rotated at 90 rpm, rather than the usual 75 to 80 rpm. Originally, the groove started on the inside, near the center of the disc, and spiraled out to the edge. In 1916, Pathé changed over to the customary rim-start format, a more nearly normal 80 rpm speed, and paper labels instead of the stamped-in, paint-filled text previously used. Pathé discs were commonly produced in 10 inch (25 cm), 10  inch (27 cm), and 11  inch (29 cm) sizes. 6  (17 cm), 8 inch (21 cm), and 14 inch (35 cm) discs were also made, as were very large 20 inch (50 cm) discs that played at 120 rpm. Due to their fragility, unwieldiness, and much higher price, the largest sizes were a commercial failure and were not produced for long.

In France, Pathé became the largest and most successful distributor of cylinder records and phonographs. These, however, failed to make significant headway in foreign markets such as the United Kingdom and the United States where other brands were already in widespread use. Although Pathé cylinder records were never popular outside France, their disc records sold successfully in many foreign countries such as the United States, United Kingdom, Germany, Italy, and Russia.

Pathé was the first company to make master recordings in a different medium than the final commercial product. In the Pathé recording studios, masters were cut on rapidly spinning wax cylinders that measured about 13 inches (33 cm) long and 4 ½ inches (11.4 cm) in diameter. Beginning in 1913, special "Paradis" cylinders about 8 inches (20.3 cm) in diameter and 8 ½ inches (21.6 cm) long were used. The large, fast-spinning cylinders allowed for a greater level of audio fidelity. The various types of commercial Pathé cylinders and discs were then dubbed (or "pantographed") from these masters. This dubbing process enabled copies of the same master recording to be made available on multiple formats. The process sometimes resulted in uneven results on the final commercial record, causing a pronounced rumble or other audio artifacts. (This rumble was generally undetectable on acoustic wind-up phonographs of the period, but is noticeable on electric and more modern equipment.)

The vertically-cut Pathé discs normally required a special Pathé phonograph equipped with a sapphire ball stylus. The advantage of the sapphire ball stylus was its permanence. There was no need to change a needle after every record side. Since most records and phonographs used a different playback method, various attachments were marketed that allowed one to equip a Pathé phonograph to play standard, laterally-cut records. Attachments were also sold to equip a standard phonograph to play Pathé records.

In 1920, Pathé introduced a line of "needle-cut" records, at first only for the US market. The needle-cut records were laterally-cut discs designed to be compatible with standard phonographs, and they were labelled Pathé Actuelle. In the following year, these "needle-cut" records were introduced in the United Kingdom and within a few more years they were selling more than the vertical Pathés, even on the continent. Attempts to market the Pathé vertical-cut discs abroad were abandoned in 1925, though they continued to sell in France until 1932.

In mid-1922, Pathé introduced a lower priced label called Perfect. This label became one of the most popular and successful "dime store" labels of the 1920s, and survived beyond the end of the US Pathé label - discontinued in 1930 - right up to 1938.

In January 1927, Pathé began recording using the new electronic microphone technology, as opposed to the strictly acoustical-mechanical method of recording they used until then.

In December 1928, the French and British Pathé phonograph assets were sold to the British Columbia Graphophone Company. In July 1929, the assets of the American Pathé record company were merged into the newly formed American Record Corporation. The Pathé and Pathé-Marconi labels and catalogue still survive, first as imprints of EMI and now currently EMI's successor Parlophone Records. The film division of Pathé Frères still survives in France.

See also 
 List of record labels
 Pathé News
 Pathé Pictures
 Pathé Records (Shanghai & Hong Kong)

References

External links 

 Official webpage of Pathé (now just a film distributor)
Pathé cylinder recordings, from the 
Pathe Records on the Internet Archive's Great 78 Project

French record labels
Vertical cut record labels
1894 establishments in France
1928 disestablishments in France
Record labels established in 1894
Record labels disestablished in 1928
Defunct record labels of France
Jazz record labels
EMI